Sir Edward Bellamy (died 1749) was a London banker who was Lord Mayor of London and Governor of the Bank of England

He was a member of the Worshipful Company of Fishmongers and an Alderman of the city from 1723. He was elected Sheriff of London for 1723–24 and Lord Mayor for 1734–35.

He was a Director of the Bank of England from 1723 to 1726 and from 1727 to 1729, serving as Deputy Governor from 1729 to 1731 and as Governor from 1731 to 1733. He replaced Samuel Holden as Governor and was succeeded by Horatio Townshend.

He was an unsuccessful candidate for the  Parliamentary seat in the General Election of 1741, coming sixth in the poll.

See also
Chief Cashier of the Bank of England

References 

Year of birth missing
1749 deaths
British bankers
Sheriffs of the City of London
18th-century lord mayors of London
Deputy Governors of the Bank of England
Governors of the Bank of England